Dacrydium comosum is a species of conifer in the family Podocarpaceae. It is endemic to Malaysia, where it is known from only five locations in Peninsular Malaysia. The species may be threatened by fire and tourism.

References

comosum
Endangered plants
Endemic flora of Peninsular Malaysia
Taxonomy articles created by Polbot
Taxa named by E. J. H. Corner